is a Chinese-Japanese animated comedy television series produced by Emon and animated by Studio LAN and supervised by Shinichi Watanabe. The production was produced in China, with modifications to the show for the Japanese broadcast. The show premiered on the same day on October 5, 2016, on Tokyo MX in Japan, and on a video sharing website bilibili in China. The anime has been licensed by Crunchyroll for its online release.

In China, the opening song was "Insistence" (执念), performed by Loki (刘畅). Meanwhile, in Japan, the opening song was "Come to See You" (オープニングテーマ「アイニコイヨ」), performed by BRATS. The ending song in both Japan and China was "My Dad Protects the Earth" (エンディングテーマ「私のパパが地球を守る 〜我爹守护地球〜」) by Lin Heye (林和夜).

A second season named To Be Heroine premiered in 2018. The series was directed by Li Haoling and animated by Studio.LAN! and Haoliners Animation League.

Cast

Chinese cast 

Tute Hameng (Chinese) as Ossan/Yashu
Shan Xin (Chinese) as Min-chan/Chenmin Jiang (姜 辰敏, Jiāng Chénmǐn)
Mie Mie (Chinese) as Futaba Hanaya/Yuye Hua (花 语叶, Huā Yǔyè)
Ding Dang (Chinese) as Hikaru Isago/Xiaoguang Sha (沙 小光, Shā Xiǎoguāng)
Liu Mingyue (Chinese) as Tōru Utsubari/Chao Liang (梁 超, Liáng Chāo)

Japanese cast 

Kenjiro Tsuda (Japanese) as Ossan/Yashu
Moa Tsukino (Japanese) as Futaba Hanaya/Yuye Hua (花屋 二葉, Hanaya Futaba)
Yutaka Aoyama/Li Lu as Yamada
Tomokazu Sugita
Takeshi Maeda
Motoko Kumai (Japanese) as Hikaru Isago/Xiaoguang Sha (沙 光, Isago Hikaru)
Omi Minami (Japanese) as Tōru Utsubari/Chao Liang (梁 超, Utsubari Tōru)
Junko Minagawa (Japanese) as Min-chan/Chenmin Jiang (ミンちゃん, Min-chan)

List of episodes 
The first season started on October 5, 2016, and ended on December 21, 2016.

Second season 
A second season of the show entitled To Be Heroine was released on May 19, 2018.

References

External links
 

2010s animated comedy television series
Chinese adult animated comedy television series
Chinese web series
Comedy anime and manga
Crunchyroll anime
Haoliners Animation League
Japanese adult animated comedy television series
Tokyo MX original programming